Sofia Goggia (born 15 November 1992) is an Italian World Cup alpine ski racer  who competes in all disciplines and specialises in the speed events of downhill and super-G.
She is a two-time Olympic downhill medalist — gold at the 2018 Winter Olympics, the first one for an Italian woman — and four-time World Cup downhill title winner (2018, 2021—2023).

Career

With only four career starts in giant slalom (and no finishes) in her World Cup career, Goggia was named to the Italian women's team for the 2013 World Championships in Schladming, Austria. She capitalized on the opportunity and posted two top ten finishes: fourth in the super-G and seventh in the super combined. Goggia attained her first World Cup podium in November 2016, a third place in giant slalom at Killington. She won the bronze medal in the same event at the World Championships in February.

Goggia's first World Cup win came in downhill in March 2017 at Jeongseon, South Korea. She followed it up with a super-G win the following day for her eleventh World Cup podium of the season. It was the fourth time that she gained multiple podiums at the same race venue, and added a fifth with two podiums at the World Cup finals in  Aspen. She finished the season with 1197 World Cup points, 13 podiums in four different disciplines and third place overall.

In 2018, she won consecutive World Cup downhills in mid-January at Bad Kleinkirchheim and Cortina d'Ampezzo. She was the gold medalist in the downhill at the 2018 Winter Olympics in PyeongChang, South Korea, and won the World Cup season title in downhill, edging out Lindsey Vonn by three points. The sporting achievements of the season earned her a nomination for the Laureus World Sports Award for Breakthrough of the Year.

A broken ankle in October 2018 caused Goggia to miss most of the World Cup season; she returned in late January 2019 with runner-up finishes in her first two starts at  She won her first race of the season since her comeback from the injury in the ladies' downhill at Crans-Montana, Switzerland, in February.

At the World Championships in Åre, Goggia won the silver medal in the Super-G, 0.02 seconds behind gold medalist Mikaela Shiffrin.

In June 2019, the Italian Olympic Committee named Goggia as ambassador for the nation’s bid to host the 2026 Winter Olympic Games in Milan-Cortina. On 24 June she was part of the Italian delegation at the IOC headquarters in Lausanne, where Milan-Cortina were elected as hosts, defeating Stockholm-Åre.

In the 2020 season, Goggia achieved two Super-G podiums - a victory in St. Moritz and a second place in Sochi – both together with teammate Federica Brignone. In early February she suffered a fall during the Super-G race in Garmisch-Partenkirchen that caused a fracture in her left arm and the premature end of the season.

In December 2020, Goggia claimed her first World Cup downhill victory in almost two years on the Oreiller-Killy slope in Val d’Isère, France, a day after a runner-up finish on the same hill in the first downhill race of the season. She continued her podium-topping year in the discipline in January 2021, with a first place in St. Anton, Austria, and back-to-back victories on the Mont Lachaux course in Crans-Montana. By winning four consecutive downhill races, Goggia became the first woman to achieve this feat since Vonn in 2018.
On 31 January, while skiing down to the valley after the cancelled super-G in Garmisch-Partenkirchen, Goggia fell on the wet snow, breaking a bone in her right knee. The injury forced her to miss the home World Championships in Cortina – started just a week after the fall – and two World Cup downhill races. She back training in early March, planning to defend her downhill standings lead in the last event of the season in Lenzerheide, Switzerland. On 17 March, Goggia became for the second time in career World Cup downhill champion, after heavy snowfall forced the cancellation of the race.

In early December 2021, Goggia won all three races in Lake Louise for her first career “hat-trick”, joining Vonn (2011, 2012, 2015) and Katja Seizinger (1997)  as the only women to win both downhills and super-G in the classic Canadian venue.
In October 2021, Goggia was named as Italy's flag bearer for the opening ceremony of the 2022 Winter Olympics in Beijing, China. On 23 January 2022, Goggia suffered a knee injury after a crash in the Cortina d'Ampezzo Super-G. She immediately started physical rehab with the aim of returning in time to defend her Olympic downhill title in mid-February. Goggia traveled to Beijing aiming to take part in the downhill, but pulled out from her flag-bearing duties in the opening ceremony on 4 February. On 15 February, despite all setbacks, she won silver in downhill – her second consecutive Olympic medal in that event. After the Olympics, Goggia did not enjoy much success in the remaining World Cup events, but nonetheless won the Downhill cup once again with her strong early season results (4 victories and a third place).

In the 2022–23 season, Goggia won five of the nine downhill races contested, also finishing three times on the podium in second place. At the World Cup finals in Soldeu, Andorra, she won her fourth crystal globe in the discipline, the third consecutive.
At the 2023 World Championships in Méribel, France, Goggia was a strong favourite for the downhill race, however, she was disqualified for straddling a gate.

Injuries
The career of the Bergamo athlete has been studded with numerous injuries.
 2010: as a teenager, she tore the anterior cruciate ligament (ACL) of both knees in two different crashes.
 February 2012: she stretched both collateral ligaments in her left knee and fractured the tibial plateau during a Europa Cup race.
 December 2013: Goggia tore anterior cruciate ligament in her left knee in a downhill crash at Lake Louise, Canada. She returned the following season but cut her campaign short again with knee problems in January 2015.
 October 2018: she fractured the fibular malleolus of her right leg during a training session in Hintertux, Austria.
 February 2020: a compound radius fracture of the left arm on the Garmisch-Partenkirchen track puts an end to her competitive season.
 January 2021: compound fracture of the lateral tibial plateau of the right knee coming down from a track to return to the hotel, again in Garmisch-Partenkirchen.
 January 2022: a crash in the Super-G of Cortina d'Ampezzo resulted in a sprained left knee, with a partial cruciate ligament injury already operated in 2013, a small fracture of the fibula and a muscular tendon injury.
 December 2022: During the first downhill of St. Moritz on 16 December 2022 she broke her hand impacting the ground in a push-up shortly after the start of the race, despite this she finished the race 2nd. She runs to Milan to have surgery and the day after she wins the second downhill.

All these injuries did not prevent her from winning twenty-two World Cup victories with a third place in the 2017 overall standings, four World Cup season titles in downhill, two medals at the World Championships, the Olympic downhill title at PyeongChang 2018 and the silver medal in the same event at Beijing 2022, only three weeks after partially tearing her ACL.

World Cup results

Season titles
 4 titles – (4 DH)

Season standings

^ 
^^

Race podiums
 22 wins – (17 DH, 5 SG)
 48 podiums – (30 DH, 12 SG, 5 GS, 1 AC)

World Championship results

Olympic results

See also
Italian skiers who closed in top 10 in overall World Cup

References

External links
 
 Sofia Goggia at FISI 
 
 Sofia Goggia at Atomic Skis

1992 births
Italian female alpine skiers
Sportspeople from Bergamo
Living people
Alpine skiers of Fiamme Gialle
Alpine skiers at the 2018 Winter Olympics
Alpine skiers at the 2022 Winter Olympics
Olympic alpine skiers of Italy
Medalists at the 2018 Winter Olympics
Medalists at the 2022 Winter Olympics
Olympic medalists in alpine skiing
Olympic gold medalists for Italy
Olympic silver medalists for Italy